Grafenau is a town in the district of Böblingen in Baden-Württemberg in Germany.

Population

References

Böblingen (district)
Württemberg